Chāquán is a Chinese martial art that features graceful movements and some acrobatic aerial maneuvers and includes a large range of weapons.

Chāquán falls under the classification Chángquán (literally "long fist"), a general term for external Northern Chinese martial arts, which are known for their extended, long movements.  Changquan also means the first form of many martial arts, so the word is not necessarily referring to the martial style called "Changquan".

The style is associated with the Hui people and related to the Turkic people from Central Asia. In the legend, a Turkic warrior named "Zha Mi-Er" (maybe Sameer [name of Arabic origin] or Dämir [meaning "iron" in Turkic])) from current Xinjiang or Central Asia passed down this martial art to the Chinese locals in the current Xandong province during the late Ming dynasty. One famous master of Chāquán was Wang Zi-Ping, who was known for his great strength. Other modern day masters include Zhang Wenguang, Ma Jinbiao, and Liu Hongchi.

Chāquán is one of the sources of the contemporary wǔshù Chángquán, which is often seen in movies and tournaments.

Chāquán is a system that has six main weapons (staff, saber, sword, spear, kwandao, hookswords). It emphasizes long range movements and stances combined with speed and power. The style includes many forms, including 10 lines of tantui for basic power training, 10 longer sets of chaquan, and other forms as well.

References

Further reading
 Wu Bin, Li Xingdong e Yu Gongbao, Essentials of Chinese Wushu, Foreign languages press, Beijing, 1992, 
 Carmona José, De Shaolin à Wudang, les arts martiaux chinois, Gui Trenadiel editeur.

External links
Kung fu Montreal, traditional Chinese martial arts - Northern Shaolin / Chaquan

Chinese martial arts
Chinese swordsmanship